The House at 912 Magoffin Avenue is a historic house in El Paso, Texas. It was built first built as a two-story house in 1898 where a one-story house once stood. It was redesigned in 1903–1905 in the Queen Anne architectural style. It was the home of Margaret Conerton, an Irish immigrant who died in the house in 1908. By 1935, it belonged to the Stubbs family. It has been listed on the National Register of Historic Places since June 23, 2003.

References

Buildings and structures in El Paso, Texas
Houses completed in 1904
National Register of Historic Places in El Paso County, Texas
Queen Anne architecture in Texas